Rafet Güngör (born 17 September 1949) is a Turkish judoka. He competed in the men's half-middleweight event at the 1976 Summer Olympics.

References

1949 births
Living people
Turkish male judoka
Olympic judoka of Turkey
Judoka at the 1976 Summer Olympics
Place of birth missing (living people)
20th-century Turkish people